Alfred Fletcher (20 January 1875 Lampersdorf, Province of Lower Silesia, German Empire – 20 September 1959 Herzogenaurach, Bavaria, West Germany) was a German soldier, Major and politician.

Life 
Fletcher fought as a soldier in World War I. After the capitulation in November 1918 he became active in the Baltic states as commander of the pro-German Baltische Landeswehr. For a short while he was military governor of Riga. After the defeat of his forces in the Latvian war of independence, he returned to Germany and entered politics as a member of the German National People's Party.

References

External links 
 Reichstag DB

1875 births
1959 deaths
People from Ząbkowice Śląskie County
People from the Province of Silesia
German National People's Party politicians
Members of the Reichstag of the Weimar Republic
Baltische Landeswehr personnel